The 2013–14 Segunda División de Futsal season is the 21st season of second-tier futsal in Spain since its inception in 1993.

The season comprises regular season and promotion playoff. Regular season 1st matchday started on September 21, 2013 and finished on May 3, 2014. After finishing regular season, top team is promoted to Primera División while the next four teams at standings play promotion playoff.

Promotion playoff began on 10 May with semifinals to best of three games. Winner of promotion playoff will be promoted to Primera División 2014–15.

Teams

Regular season standings

FC Barcelona B and ElPozo Ciudad de Murcia can't play promotion playoff due its reserve team status.

Promotion playoffs

1st round

1st leg

2nd leg

3rd leg

Final

1st leg

2nd leg

3rd leg

Uruguay Tenerife won series 2–1 and promoted to Primera División.

Top scorers

References

External links
Full schedule
2013–14 season at lnfs.es

See also
2013–14 Primera División de Futsal
2013–14 Copa del Rey de Futsal
Segunda División B de Futsal

2013–14 in Spanish futsal
Futsal2
Segunda División de Futsal seasons